María de Quiñones (d. 1669) was a Spanish book printer. 

She married the printer Juan de la Cuesta in 1602. In 1607, her spouse left for India, and gave her a power of attorney to manage his printing company in his absence. She remained in charge until 1666. Her company was one of the most successful in Spain and responsible for the publication of a large number of the literature of the Spanish Golden Age, including authors such as Lope de Vega, Tirso de Molina and Pedro Calderón de la Barca.

A street in Madrid is named Quiñones after her.

See also
 List of women printers and publishers before 1800

References
 Memoria de mujeres en el callejero de Madrid: Evolución de los topónimos femeninos. Consultado el 16 de marzo de 2015.

16th-century births
1669 deaths
17th-century Spanish businesswomen
17th-century Spanish businesspeople
17th-century printers
Spanish printers
Women printers